Ragged Island (Harpswell, Maine) is a privately owned island in Harpswell, Maine, in Cumberland County, Maine, which is geographically within Casco Bay in the Gulf of Maine.

History
Ragged Island is notable as having been the summer home of poet Edna St. Vincent Millay and husband Eugen Jan Boissevain from 1933 until her death in 1950. It is now a private residence.

Whatever the history of the island's name, at least one 1790 maritime chart identifies it simply as Cold Arse.

Preservation
Ragged Island provides habitat for a large and diverse population of nesting seabirds, including the eider duck, black guillemot, greater black-backed gull, herring gull and osprey.  Maine Coast Heritage Trust led an effort to protect the island, and in 2008 the U.S. Fish and Wildlife Service’s National Coastal Wetlands Conservation Grant program awarded a $323,000 Coastal Wetland grant to purchase a conservation easement on the property.  The easement, held by Maine Coast Heritage Trust, permanently protects the  natural area used by seabirds for nesting on Ragged Island.

Notable people
 Edna St. Vincent Millay, poet
 Elijah Kellogg, minister, lecturer, author

References

External links

 Ragged Island on Google Maps
 Harpswell Historical Society Museum
 Preserving a Storied Casco Bay Island
 Maine Coast Heritage Trust
 Songs about Ragged Island
"Harpswell and Adjacent Islands, Casco Bay, Maine" (1894) by J.H. Stuart & Co., from the David Rumsey Map Collection

Islands of Cumberland County, Maine
Harpswell, Maine
Private islands of Maine